The Green Party of Iran (GPI) is a Green political party dissident to Iran's Islamic Republic government.

A Banned party without any physical presence in Iran, it has a radical stance towards Iranian Department of Environment and considers it a "façade of environmental concern for the benefit of international observers", arguing that it "covers up environmental disasters of the state". It is an exception to the Iranian environmentalist movement, in which most of organizations and NGOs are tolerated, and sometimes encouraged by the government.

The party was founded in California, U.S. as a "professional Iranian expatriate opposition" and was reportedly based in Canada as of 1999. As of 2014, it is based in Germany.

References

External links
Green Party of Iran

Green political parties
Banned political parties in Iran
1999 establishments in California
Political parties established in 1999
Green political parties in Germany
Iranian organizations based in Germany